Pál Jávor may refer to:

 Pál Jávor (painter) (1880–1923), Hungarian painter
 Pál Jávor (actor) (1902–1959), Hungarian actor
 Pál Jávor (footballer) (1907–1989), Hungarian football player and coach who spent most of his career with Újpest FC